Himam is a 1983 Indian Malayalam-language masala film, directed by Joshiy. The film stars Prem Nazir, Shankar, Shanavas and Sripriya. The film has musical score by Shyam. The movie is a remake of the 1973 movie Yaadon Ki Baaraat.

The story revolves around a man who is separated from and later reunites with his sons.

Plot
Prasad, a middle-class man, lived with his wife, Ammu and sons, Vijay and Renji. Ammu had taught her sons, a song called "Gomedakam" (which means "onyx"). They lead a happy life until one day, Ammu is killed by two goons, led by the crime lord. Prasad manages to escape with his sons, however, the three are separated. As time passes, Prasad becomes a criminal, who is still haunted by the murder of his wife. He vows to find his sons Vijay and Renji and avenge his wife's death.

Vijay is a photographer while Renji does gigs to make a living. Vijay meets Sunita, though they initially dislike each other, they fall in love. Renji falls for his co-singer Indu. Soon, the brothers find each other. Prasad realises that Vijay and Renji are his sons but can't contact them. In the end, Prasad kills the villain and reunites with his sons.

Cast
Prem Nazir as Prasad
Shankar as Vijay
Shanavas as Renji
Sripriya as Sunita
Sumalatha as Indu
Manjula Vijayakumar as Ammu
Kundara Johny as Gireesh
Balan K. Nair as Vasu
P. R. Varalakshmi as Sharada
Jose Prakash as Jayakanth
Cochin Haneefa as Ameer Khan
Anuradha as Dancer
Prathapachandran as Madhavan
P. K. Abraham as Varma
Thodupuzha Radhakrishnan as Menon

Soundtrack
The music was composed by Shyam and the lyrics were written by Bichu Thirumala and Mankombu Gopalakrishnan.

References

External links
 

1983 films
1980s Malayalam-language films
Malayalam remakes of Hindi films

1980s masala films
Films directed by Joshiy